Tavankut may refer to:

 Donji Tavankut, a village near Subotica, Serbia
 Gornji Tavankut, a village near Subotica, Serbia